Tavenner is a surname. Notable people with the surname include:

Clyde Howard Tavenner (1882–1942), American politician
Frank S. Tavenner (1866–1950), American politician
Frank S. Tavenner Jr. (1895–1964), American lawyer
Marilyn Tavenner (born 1951), American government official and healthcare executive

See also
Tavenner House